Chapala may refer to:

 Chapala, Jalisco, a town in the Mexican state of Jalisco, on the northern shore of Lake Chapala
 Lake Chapala, the largest freshwater lake in Mexico, in the states of Jalisco and Michoacán
 Chapala, a 1899 painting by Félix Bernardelli
 Cyclone Chapala, a powerful tropical cyclone occurring in the Arabian Sea during the 2015 season

Persons with the given name
 Chapala Nayak, Indian actress, played in Sri Jagannath

See also
 Cha'palaa (also known as Chachi or Cayapa), a language 
 Chapala Chennigaraya, a 1990 Indian film